Time in Transnistria (officially the Pridnestrovian Moldavian Republic), a breakaway state internationally recognised as being part of Moldova, is given by Eastern European Time (EET; UTC+02:00). Daylight saving time, which moves one hour ahead to UTC+03:00 is observed from the last Sunday in March to the last Sunday in October.

As Transnistria is not an internationally recognised sovereign state, it is not granted a zone.tab entry on the IANA time zone database.

History 
The government announced on 10 October 2011 that they would not be switching back from DST, after President Igor Smirnov signed a decree abolishing winter time. However, Smirnov changed his mind according to local media reports, and Transnistria continued observing both winter and summer time.

See also 
Time in Europe
List of time zones by country
List of time zones by UTC offset

References

External links 
Current time in Transnistria at Time.is